Bishopbriggs railway station is a railway station serving Bishopbriggs in East Dunbartonshire, Scotland.

History 
Bishopbriggs was one of the original stations on the Edinburgh and Glasgow Railway, opened in 1842. During the 1960s, the station was scheduled for closure under the Beeching Axe but a local campaign managed to save it, although the original station buildings and footbridge were demolished. They were replaced by a modular ticket office and waiting room, as well as a new footbridge. The ticket office and waiting room was replaced with a modern glass and steel building in 2002, of a similar design to that at Croy railway station.

Present day 

There is no parking with very little provided on nearby streets.

Services are provided by ScotRail, primarily using Class 170 Turbostar trains, however Class 156 Super Sprinter and Class 158 Express Sprinter DMU's are also used. From 2019/ 2020 Hitachi Class 385's will operate most services with a few exceptions (peak time trains to Perth for example) as electrification will only go as far as Alloa and Dunblane.

During Glasgow Queen Street Tunnel works in summer 2016, trains served Glasgow Queen Street Low Level ran into Glasgow through Springburn calling additionally at Springburn and back to Bishopbriggs via Anniesland and Maryhill running non-stop.

The station was briefly featured in Bill Forsyth's 1980 film That Sinking Feeling.

Future 

Following a consultation  a potential new station with Park and Ride facilities at Westerhill, (West end of the old Cadder Yard) has been identified.

In February 2017, the published Local Development Plan for Kirkintilloch and Twechar included a marker for a potential railway station in the same location.

Services

2006/07 
Change at Croy for Edinburgh or at Stirling for Alloa, Perth, Dundee, Aberdeen.

Sundays: there was an hourly service in each direction.

From May 2008 
Sundays: There is an hourly service in each direction to Glasgow and Alloa.

2017
Monday - Friday there is usually a half hourly service to both Glasgow Queen Street and Stirling, with one train an hour running from Stirling to Alloa and most other service extending to Dunblane calling at Bridge of Allan. There are a couple of peak services which extend beyond Dunblane to Perth and Dundee.
Saturday, the same as Monday - Friday but with no peak extras
Sunday, an hourly train to Glasgow Queen Street in one direction and Alloa in the other, Alloa service call at Lenzie, Croy, Larbert and Stirling

References

Notes

Sources 

 
 

Railway stations in East Dunbartonshire
SPT railway stations
Railway stations served by ScotRail
Railway stations in Great Britain opened in 1842
Former North British Railway stations
Bishopbriggs
1842 establishments in Scotland